Bad Abbach is a municipality in the district Kelheim, Bavaria, Germany. Due to its sulphurous springs it has the status of a spa town.

References

External links
 Bad Abbach website

Spa towns in Germany
Kelheim (district)